Albert Breer (born January 26, 1980) is a current American football journalist and reporter for Sports Illustrateds MMQB. Breer spent time covering the New England Patriots for The MetroWest Daily News where he contributed stories to the Boston Herald, and later covered the NFL for The Boston Globe, The Dallas Morning News, Sporting News and NFL Network.

In June 2018, Breer took over as writer of the Monday Morning Quarterback column from Peter King, who left Sports Illustrated for NBC Sports. He is also a content strategist for The MMQB, Sports Illustrateds NFL vertical.

Notable incidents 
Breer was the writer most often questioning Patriots coach Bill Belichick in the famous 2014 "We're on to Cincinnati" press conference. Breer has said that this led the NFL Network to ban him from covering the Patriots for the remainder of his contract, which ended in June 2016.

Breer was suspended from the NFL Network from April 25, 2016, through June 1, 2016, for undisclosed reasons and was prohibited from posting on social media during that time. Prior to his suspension he had agreed to take a position with the MMQB.

In May 2017 Breer dismissed widely reported allegations that baseball player Adam Jones was the target of racist taunts by fans at Fenway Park because, according to Breer "I've probably been to 200 games at Fenway in my life. Never heard a slur yelled at a player."

In 2017 Breer repeatedly defended NFL front offices against allegations of "blackballing" Colin Kaepernick for his decision to protest the national anthem.

References 

Living people
American male journalists
Ohio State University School of Communication alumni
1980 births
People from Sudbury, Massachusetts
Sportspeople from Middlesex County, Massachusetts